Wacki: Kosmiczna Rozgrywka is an adventure game by Seven Stars Multimedia released on July 1, 1998 for Windows.

Plot and gameplay 
Franz Josef and Edek Baryła, two Polish teenagers, have to help Aargh the alien gather pieces of A.C.M.E to stop a meteorite from destroying his home, because if his planet is gone, Earth will soon fall to the same fate.

The game has the generic gaming interface of a hand-drawn adventure title. It contains colourful cartoon, graphics and specific humor to Polish culture.

The game contains various easter eggs that were only discovered decades after the game's release.

Production 
In 1996, CD Projekt signed an exclusive distribution agreement with Seven Stars, which included this game upon its release.

Critical reception 
GamePressure and Gry Online gave it 8.6. Ekspert deemed it the perfect title for native Polish adventure gamers. Games Guru felt it was part of the group of cult games that held a special place in the hearts of older Polish gamers. Onet Technologie noted that while the game was humorous it is quite hard. Benchmark felt that the artistic achievements of Seven Stars ended with this title. Adventure Zone thought the game would appeal to lovers of titles like Day of the Tentacle. InnPoland felt the title didn't have innovative graphics or interface.

References

External links 

 Interview with Jarek Łojewski about this game
 Retrospective on this title.

1998 video games
Adventure games
CD Projekt games
Single-player video games
Video games developed in Poland
Video games set in Poland
Windows games
Windows-only games